The 1903–04 Challenge Cup was the 8th staging of rugby league's oldest knockout competition, the Challenge Cup.

Halifax became the second team to record back-to-back Cup wins but would not reach another final until 1921, nor win the Cup again until 1931.

Qualifier

First round

Second round

Quarterfinals

Semifinals

Final

The final was contested by the Halifax and Warrington clubs at the Willows in Salford on Saturday 30 April 1904, in front of a crowd of 17,041. Halifax retained their title beating Warrington 8–3.

References

External links
Challenge Cup official website 
Challenge Cup 1903/04 results at Rugby League Project

Challenge Cup
Challenge Cup